Jewish fundamentalism refers to fundamentalism in the context of Judaism. The term fundamentalism was originally used in reference to Christian fundamentalism, a Protestant movement emphasizing biblical literalism. Today, it is commonly used more generally in reference to movements that oppose modernist, liberal and ecumenical tendencies in society and their own religion, often coupled with extremist ideologies and/or political movements. This is important in the Jewish context because the two movements most commonly associated with Jewish fundamentalism, Religious Zionism and Haredi Judaism, stray far from Biblical literalism due to the importance of Oral Law within Judaism. In fact, Karaism, the Jewish movement most known for Biblical literalism, is rarely considered fundamentalist.

Overview 
Like other fundamentalist movements, fundamentalist Judaism usually presents itself as the only valid form of the religion, the ethnic culture, and the truth. However, Religious Zionism and Haredi Judaism, the two movements most broadly associated with Jewish fundamentalism, differ in significant ways and have historically been opposed to each other, although recently there has been more overlap with the rise of the Hardal movement. Religious Zionism is more associated with political extremism, while Haredi Judaism is more focused on anti-modernism, control over women by men along with patriarchal family structures.

Haredi Judaism 

Haredi Judaism consists of groups within Orthodox Judaism that are characterized by their strict adherence to halakha (Jewish law) and traditions, in opposition to modern values and practices. Its members are usually referred to as ultra-Orthodox in English; however, the term "ultra-Orthodox" is considered pejorative by many of its adherents, who prefer terms like strictly Orthodox or Haredi. Haredi Jews regard themselves as the most religiously authentic group of Jews, although other movements of Judaism disagree.

Religious Zionism  

Religious Zionism is an ideology that combines Zionism and Orthodox Judaism. It began primarily with the teachings of Rabbi Abraham Isaac Kook, which saw Zionism as part of a divine scheme to return Jews to their homeland and eventually bring about the coming of the Messiah. Religious Zionism gained a new force after Six-Day War in 1967, when Israel conquered the West Bank, a territory rich in Biblical history. The Gush Emunim movement took off under the leadership of Tzvi Yehudah Kook and spearheaded the proliferation of Israeli settlements in the newly conquered territory.

Religious Zionism is still a relatively broad term encompassing both moderate and extreme elements. The extremist elements are often associated with anti-Arab racism and violence, often with ideological inspiration from Kahanism. They have been associated with Jewish religious terrorism, both against Palestinians and in some cases even against the Israel Defense Forces. The Hilltop Youth movement is especially associated with the most extremist forms of Religious Zionism.

Study 
Jewish fundamentalism was ignored for much of the 20th century, it was only when it began to have an effect on Israeli politics and international relations that scholars began to study it in earnest.

See also
 Gush Emunim
 Halachic state
 Jewish Defense League
 Jewish Defense Organization
 Jewish religious terrorism
 Judaism and violence
 Lev Tahor
 Meir Kahane
 Kach (political party)
 Kahanism
 Noahidism
 Sikrikim
 The Temple Institute
 Zealots
 Sicarii
 Zionist political violence

References

Bibliography

External links
 Land and the Lord: Jewish Fundamentalism in Israel at University of Pennsylvania
 Washington Report: Jewish fundamentalism

 
Orthodox Judaism